Araba 2004 was a 2004 single by musician Mustafa Sandal from the album Seven New Version, carrying five versions of the song.

Track list

 Araba 2004, 2004
 Track 01: "Araba (single version)"  (3:53)
 Track 2: "Araba (extended version)"  (4:34)
 Track 3: "Araba (club mix)"  (4:46)
 Track 4: "Fıkra"  (4:34)
 Track 5: "Araba (instrumental version)"  (3:52)

Charts

2004 singles
Mustafa Sandal songs
2003 songs
Universal Music Group singles